Thomas Fleming (15 November 1901 – ?) was a Scottish footballer who played as a full back for Dundee, Fulham and Wigan Athletic. He made 114 appearances in all competitions for Fulham between 1922 and 1925.

References

1901 births
Scottish footballers
Fulham F.C. players
English Football League players
Association football defenders
Year of death missing
Dundee F.C. players